Casino, an electoral district of the Legislative Assembly in the Australian state of New South Wales had two incarnations, from 1930 until 1968 and from 1971 until 1981.


Members

Election results

Elections in the 1970s

1978

1976

1973

1971

Elections in the 1960s

1965

1964 by-election

1962

Elections in the 1950s

1959

1956

1953

1950

Elections in the 1940s

1947

1944

1941

Elections in the 1930s

1938

1935

1932

1930

References

New South Wales state electoral results by district